Aquarama Kristiansand or simply Aquarama is a multi-purpose arena in Kristiansand, Norway. The complex houses a water park/spa, fitness centre and sports hall that holds up to 1,700 people. The sports hall is home to the Kristiansand Vipers handball team.

References

External links 
Aquarama on Visit Norway

Indoor arenas in Norway
Handball venues in Norway
Buildings and structures in Kristiansand